Cirilo Saucedo Nájera (born 5 January 1982 in Acámbaro, Guanajuato), known as Cirilo Saucedo, is a Mexican former professional goalkeeper who last played for Juárez.

Club career
Saucedo came to prominence playing for Club León of the Primera A in Mexico. After leading the team to a championship in the 2003 Clausura, Saucedo's team lost to Dorados de Sinaloa in the playoff to determine which team was promoted to the Primera División.  Nevertheless, Saucedo moved up, being contracted by the Dorados to reinforce their team.

In his first season in the first division, Saucedo started all 17 games for Sinaloa, allowing 32 goals. Following the 2006 Clausura season, Saucedo's team Dorados was relegated to the Mexican First Division "A". Rather than playing in the lower divisions of the lower leagues, Saucedo was snatched up by CD Veracruz prior to the Apertura 2006 season. A shoulder injury limited him to play in only 2 games for the Red Sharks.

In 2007, he was traded to UANL Tigres for Sebastián González. He spent 3 "short" tournaments there before the 2008 Apertura when the arrival of Oscar Pérez prompted Saucedo's exit from the club.

Tigres loaned the goalkeeper to newly promoted Indios de Ciudad Juárez where he consolidated himself as a starter; he contributed to Indios' semi-final run of the Mexican championship, and more importantly staying at top flight of Mexican football.

With the conclusion of his loan, Saucedo returned to Tigres for the 2009 Apertura. Later he went to win the Superliga with UANL Tigres. After a tied game with Chicago Fire (1–1) and penalty kicks (4–3).

Personal life
His mother is a United States citizen and therefore, he had the option of playing for the United States.

Career statistics

International

Honours
Tijuana
Liga MX: Apertura 2012

Mexico U23
CONCACAF Olympic Qualifying Championship: 2004

References

External links
 
 
 
 Cirilo Saucedo at ESPN Deportes 
 
 
 

1982 births
Living people
Footballers from Guanajuato
Dorados de Sinaloa footballers
C.D. Veracruz footballers
Club León footballers
Tigres UANL footballers
Indios de Ciudad Juárez footballers
Club Tijuana footballers
Atlético Morelia players
Liga MX players
Association football goalkeepers
Mexico international footballers
Mexican footballers
Footballers at the 2003 Pan American Games
Pan American Games bronze medalists for Mexico
Medalists at the 2003 Pan American Games
Pan American Games medalists in football